Sun Boy (Dirk Morgna) is a superhero appearing in media published by DC Comics, primarily as a member of the Legion of Super-Heroes in the 30th and 31st centuries. He has the ability to generate internal solar energy to whatever degree he wishes, from enough to light a single candle to enough to melt nearly any obstacle.

Sun Boy first appeared in 1961 during the Silver Age of Comic Books.

Publication history
Sun Boy first appeared in Action Comics #276 (as a cameo in a Supergirl story) and was created by Jerry Siegel and Jim Mooney. His first full appearance (albeit as an impostor) is in Adventure Comics #290.

Fictional character biography

Silver Age
 
Dirk Morgna's father owns a nuclear power plant, where Dirk works as a helper. While he is delivering supplies to one of the plant's scientists, Dr. Zaxton Regulus, the machine the scientist is working on explodes resulting in the death of fellow worker Zarl Hendricks. Dr. Regulus blames the accident, and his subsequent dismissal, on the interruption. He tries to gain revenge on Dirk by throwing him in an atomic reactor; however, due to Dirk's "one-in-a-million genetic structure" instead of killing him, the radiation gives him the power to generate heat and light.

Dirk applies for the Legion, as Sun Boy, but is rejected as he has only demonstrated his ability to generate light. He is later accepted when he shows his heat-generation ability.

"Five Years Later"
During the "Five Year Gap" following the Magic Wars, Sun Boy becomes leader of the Legion amidst a series of defections which results in his resignation. Soon afterwards, Sun Boy is hired by Earthgov as a public relations liaison, using his good looks and popularity to spin public opinion. Earthgov is revealed to be under Dominator control and Dirk complies with their demands despite personal misgivings. When the truth is revealed, he is branded a traitor to the Legion and Earth. Dirk is later exposed to a fatal dose of radiation when a powersphere explodes next to him during the destruction of the Moon. He is killed by his sometime lover Circe, in an act of euthanasia. His corpse is later animated for a short time by former teammate Wildfire.

Shortly before Dirk's death, the members of the Dominators' highly classified "Batch SW6" escaped captivity. Originally, Batch SW6 appeared to be a group of teenage Legionnaire clones, created from samples apparently taken just prior to Ferro Lad's death at the hands of the Sun-Eater. Later, they were revealed to be time-paradox duplicates, every bit as legitimate as their older counterparts. After Earth was destroyed in a disaster reminiscent of the destruction of Krypton over a millennium earlier, a few dozen surviving cities and their inhabitants reconstituted their world as New Earth. The SW6 Legionnaires remained, and their version of Sun Boy assumed the code name Inferno.

Inferno made an appearance in Final Crisis: Legion of 3 Worlds #5, among many Legionnaires from throughout the Multiverse.

Post-Zero Hour
In post-Zero Hour continuity, Dirk Morgna is a supporting character, who occasionally gains "Sun Boy" powers, but is not a member of the Legion.

Again blaming Dirk for his dismissal, Dr. Regulus attempts to kill Morgna by injecting him with radioactive gold. This instead causes him to glow white hot, blinding Regulus. He is unable to control this power and has to wear a special suit to protect others from it. While helping the Legion battle Regulus, he uses up all the energy and returns to normal.

Dirk returns in Legionnaires #71 (May 1999), in which he is possessed by an elemental spirit called Ph'yr, one of the four Elements of Disaster, and turns into a living humanoid fireball. The elementals wish to gain Mordru's power. Dirk manages to regain control, and helps the Legion and the stone elemental Brika/Roxx defeat the two who had given themselves over to the elemental spirits.

Threeboot
In the 2004 revised Legion continuity, unlike the rest of his Legion comrades, Dirk Morgna's parents openly support the galactic movement the Legion represents. Joining the Legion as Sun Boy, Cosmic Boy names him the group's field leader. Confused as to whether or not his Legion membership is his desire or that of his parents, Dirk ultimately opts to resign from the group. He then decides to help the myriad of exiled descendants living in "otherspace" in the wake of the defeat of their leader, Praetor Lemnos. Ruefully, the Legion accedes to his request, but hope that Dirk will eventually return to their ranks.

Dirk and his associates are kidnapped by the Dominators, who wish to steal their powers, but they are rescued by the Legion and the Wanderers.

Sun Boy returns to the Legion and reveals that he has had all remaining members of Terra Firma arrested. His return is put to a vote per his request.

This version of Sun Boy was killed by Superboy-Prime in Legion of Three Worlds #3. His body is later revived as part of the Black Lantern Corps in Adventure Comics (vol. 2) #4.

Post-Infinite Crisis
The events of the Infinite Crisis miniseries have restored a close analogue of the Pre-Crisis on Infinite Earths Legion to continuity, as seen in "The Lightning Saga" story arc in Justice League of America and Justice Society of America, and in the "Superman and the Legion of Super-Heroes" story arc in Action Comics. In the latter storyline, Sun Boy had been captured by Earth Man and plugged into a machine, which used his powers to turn many of the suns in the galaxy red. Sun Boy is later rescued by his teammates.

Legion of Three Worlds
In the Final Crisis: Legion of Three Worlds storyline, which follows on from Superman and the Legion of Super-Heroes, Sun Boy is shown to have been deeply weakened and traumatised by his imprisonment, to the point where he cannot use his powers anymore. To this end, Dirk hands in his Flight Ring, effectively resigning from the Legion. In the course of the adventure, the other two Legions are pulled in to battle the Legion of Super-Villains. During the fight, the "Threeboot" Sun Boy is frozen solid and crushed to pieces by Superboy-Prime, causing the elder Dirk pain. Soon after, Dirk decides to don his flight ring again, and joins the fight, just in time to save Polar Boy from death at the hands of Superboy-Prime.

Aftermath
In the new Legion of Super-Heroes ongoing series, Sun Boy is one of many Legionnaires appalled by the Earth Government forcing the Legion to take on Earth-Man as a member. Still incensed over the way he was used, Sun Boy is steadfastly disgusted by Earth-Man's place on the team, even after the former criminal saves him from a Xenophobe attack. However, during an attack from the xenophobe group "Earthforce", Sun Boy saves Earth-Man from certain death, declaring that "The Legion takes care of its own". Sun Boy perishes in a starcruiser crash on a strange planet; his body is later cooked and eaten by the planet's sentient inhabitants.

In the "Watchmen" sequel "Doomsday Clock", Sun Boy is among the Legion of Super-Heroes members that appear in the present after Doctor Manhattan undid the experiment that erased the Legion of Super-Heroes and the Justice Society of America.

Powers and abilities
Sun Boy can internally generate a seemingly limitless amount of electromagnetic radiation, both heat and visible light. He is also immune to virtually all forms of heat and radiation (except when he was killed off during the "Five-Year-Gap" era).

Weaknesses
Sun Boy's power to radiate light and heat can be reflected back on him by mirrors, jewels and creatures that are reflective. If he increases his radiating power to full strength he can crack mirrors in these situations. One limit to his power is that he cannot risk melting metal in proximity to any persons, since the intense heat required would be lethal.

Though it rarely came up given his ability, Dirk was revealed to suffer from nyctophobia.

Equipment
As a member of the Legion of Super-Heroes he is provided a Legion Flight Ring. It allows him to fly and protects him from the vacuum of space and other dangerous environments, and has additionally been modified by Brainiac 5 to be heat resistant.

In other media
Sun Boy makes non-speaking appearances in the animated series Legion of Super Heroes. This version has longer hair and yellow eyes with black sclera, and additionally gains fiery hair whenever he uses his powers and leaves a fiery trail behind him as he flies.

References

External links
 SUN BOY at the LEGION Collection - http://jameskeeley777.wixsite.com/legion/sun-boy
 A Hero History Of Sun Boy

DC Comics metahumans
DC Comics superheroes
Comics characters introduced in 1961
Fictional characters with fire or heat abilities
Fictional characters who can manipulate light
Characters created by Jerry Siegel
Characters created by Jim Mooney